The 1979 Swedish speedway season was the 1979 season of motorcycle speedway in Sweden.

Individual

Individual Championship
The 1979 Swedish Individual Speedway Championship final was held on 25 August in Kumla. Jan Andersson won the Swedish Championship.

Junior Championship
 
Winner - Lars Rosberg

Team

Team Championship
Getingarna won division 1 and were declared the winners of the Swedish Speedway Team Championship for the tenth time. The team included Richard Hellsén, Anders Michanek and Tommy Nilsson.

Skepparna won the second division, while Eldarna and Solkatterna won the third division east and west respectively.

See also 
 Speedway in Sweden

References

Speedway leagues
Professional sports leagues in Sweden
Swedish
Seasons in Swedish speedway